Tulard is a surname. Notable people with the surname include:

André Tulard (1899–1967), French civil servant
Jean Tulard (born 1933), French historian

French-language surnames